Broderipia is a genus of sea snails, marine gastropod mollusks in the family Trochidae, the top snails.

Description
The shell is limpet-shaped, non-spiral, oblong-ovate and flattened. The shell is bilaterally symmetrical when adult. The apex is either subcentral or posterior, and either remaining as a minute recumbent spiral or lost in the adult shell. The ovate aperture is very large and internally brilliantly
iridescent or almost deprived of nacre.

Distribution
The species of this marine genus occurs in the Red Sea, Gulf of Oman, Mauritius, New Caledonia, French Polynesia and in the Pacific Ocean.

Species
Species within the genus Broderipia include:
 Broderipia cumingii A. Adams, 1851
 Broderipia eximia G. & H. Nevill, 1869
 Broderipia iridescens (Broderip, 1834)
 Broderipia nitidissima Deshayes, 1863
 Broderipia rosea (Broderip, 1834)
 Broderipia subiridescens (Pilsbry, 1890)

References

 Vaught, K.C. (1989). A classification of the living Mollusca. American Malacologists: Melbourne, FL (USA). . XII, 195 pp

External links

 
Trochidae
Gastropod genera